"Down That Road" is a song by British singer-songwriter Shara Nelson, released July 1993 on Cooltempo Records as the debut single from her first solo album, What Silence Knows (1993). It peaked at number 19 on the UK Singles Chart, reached number one on the European Dance Radio Chart, and became a top-20 hit on the US Billboard Hot Dance Club Play chart.

Critical reception
In his weekly UK chart commentary, James Masterton wrote, "Shara Nelson makes her Top 40 debut with a fairly standard piece of pop-soul but with continued airplay may well breach the Top 10 if she is lucky." Andy Beevers from Music Week gave it four out of five, describing it as "a classy song that grows in stature the more you hear it." He added, "Paul Oakenfold and Steve Osborne's Perfecto Mix is surprisingly funky while Frankie Foncett opts for the soulful vocals. It has been getting a positive club reaction, but its chart potential will dépend more on radio exposure." Brad Beatnik from the RM Dance Update wrote, "Strings, horns, funky keys and thumping rhythms are the hallmarks of this classy debut by the former Massive vocalist." He declared it as "poppy". Another editor, James Hamilton, declared it as a "plaintive Massive Attack girl's subtle anti-segregation message".

Track listings
 UK CD single (7243 8 80730 2 8)
 "Down That Road" (Radio Edit) — 3:47
 "Down That Road" (Perfecto Edit) — 4:37
 "Down That Road" (Album Mix) — 5:18
 "Down That Road" (Full Length Perfecto Mix) — 6:28
 "Down That Road" (Barkin' Loud Mix) — 6:22
 "Down That Road" (Frankie Foncett Mix) — 5:06

 European CD single (7243 8 80732 2 6)
 "Down That Road" (Radio Edit) — 3:47
 "Down That Road" (Perfecto Edit) — 4:37
 "Down That Road" (Barkin' Loud Mix) — 6:22
 "Down That Road" (Frankie Foncett Mix) — 5:06

Charts

Release history

References

External links
 

Shara Nelson songs
1993 singles
1993 songs
Cooltempo Records singles
Songs written by Shara Nelson
Songs written by Attrell Cordes